This is a list of members of the 26th South African Parliament.

Members

African Christian Democratic Party 
 Cheryllyn Dudley ACDP
 Kenneth Meshoe ACDP
 Steven Swart ACDP

African Independent Congress 
 Mandla Galo AIC
 Steven Jafta AIC
 Lulama Ntshayisa AIC

African National Congress 
 Beverley Abrahams ANC
 Freddie Adams ANC
 Patricia Emily Adams ANC
 Vatiswa Bam-Mugwanya ANC
 Obed Bapela ANC
 Joyce Basson ANC
 Simphiwe Bekwa ANC
 Francois Beukman ANC
 Fezile Bhengu ANC
 Ruth Bhengu ANC
 Phumzile Bhengu-Kombe ANC
 Kate Bilankulu ANC
 Hendrietta Bogopane-Zulu ANC
 Bongani Bongo ANC
 John Bonhomme ANC
 Mnyamezeli Booi ANC
 Grace Boroto ANC
 Lynne Brown ANC
 Rosemary Capa ANC
 Ndumiso Capa ANC
 Yunus Carrim ANC
 Mosie Cele ANC
 Bheki Cele ANC
 Patrick Chauke ANC
 Sindisiwe Chikunga ANC
 Dorothy Chiloane ANC
 Fatima Chohan ANC
 Mamonare Chueu ANC
 Elsie Coleman ANC
 Jeremy Cronin ANC
 Siyabonga Cwele ANC
 Rob Davies ANC
 Thoko Didiza ANC
 Clarah Dikgale ANC
 Mervyn Dirks ANC
 Dorries Dlakude ANC
 Bathabile Dlamini ANC
 Sizani Dlamini-Dubazana ANC
 Ayanda Dlodlo ANC
 Bongekile Dlomo ANC
 Beauty Dlulane ANC
 Mary-Ann Dunjwa ANC
 Ebrahim Ebrahim ANC
 Zukisa Faku ANC
 Cedric Frolick ANC
 Joan Fubbs ANC
 Gamede Dennis Dumisani ANC
 Ndabakayise Gcwabaza ANC
 Malusi Gigaba ANC
 Nomalungelo Gina ANC
 Monwabisi Goqwana ANC
 Pravin Gordhan ANC
 Donald Mlindwa Gumede ANC
 Derek Hanekom ANC
 Patekile Holomisa ANC
 John Jeffery ANC
 Tina Joemat-Pettersson ANC
 Lulu Johnson ANC
 Mcebisi Jonas ANC
 Mziwamadoda Kalako ANC
 Charles Kekana ANC
 Hellen Kekana ANC
 Pinky Kekana ANC
 Ezekiel Kekana ANC
 Maesela David Kekana ANC
 Lefu Khoarai ANC
 Dalton Khosa ANC
 Makhosi Khoza ANC
 Timothy Khoza ANC
 Nthabiseng Khunou ANC
 Julie Kilian ANC
 Gerhard Koornhof ANC
 Nicolaas Koornhof ANC
 Zoe Kota-Fredericks ANC
 Mmamoloko Kubayi-Ngubane ANC
 Luwellyn Landers ANC
 Regina Lesoma ANC
 Dipuo Letsatsi-Duba ANC
 Fezeka Loliwe ANC
 Zukile Luyenge ANC
 Sahlulele Luzipo ANC
 Jerome Maake ANC
 Xitlhangoma Mabasa ANC
 Pule Mabe ANC
 Peace Mabe ANC
 Livhuhani Mabija ANC
 Patrick Mabilo ANC
 Rejoice Mabudafhasi ANC
 Andrew Madella ANC
 Winnie Madikizela-Mandela ANC
 Celiwe Madlopha ANC
 Maesela Patrick ANC
 Veronica Mafolo ANC
 Nocawe Mafu ANC
 Nosilivere Magadla ANC
 Dikeledi Magadzi ANC
 Gratitude Magwanishe ANC
 Tandi Mahambehlala ANC
 Fish Mahlalela ANC
 Jabulani Mahlangu ANC
 Dikeledi Mahlangu ANC
 David Mahlobo ANC
 Moloko Maila ANC
 Fikile Majola ANC
 Lusizo Makhubela-Mashele ANC
 Zondi Makhubele ANC
 Thomas Makondo ANC
 Thabang Makwetla ANC
 Hope Malgas ANC
 Johanna Maluleke ANC
 Boitumelo Maluleke ANC
 Buti Manamela ANC
 Duduzile Manana ANC
 Mduduzi Manana ANC
 Millicent Manana ANC
 Mandla Mandela ANC
 Tozama Mantashe ANC
 Kebby Maphatsoe ANC
 Nosiviwe Mapisa-Nqakula ANC
 Mohlopi Mapulane ANC
 Benedict Martins ANC
 Siphosezwe Masango ANC
 Elizabeth Masehela ANC
 Lindiwe Maseko ANC
 Candith Mashego-Dlamini ANC
 Buoang Mashile ANC
 Mzwandile Masina ANC
 Amos Masondo ANC
 Masuku Madala Backson ANC
 Michael Masutha ANC
 Joe Maswanganyi ANC
 Hunadi Mateme ANC
 Cassel Mathale ANC
 Dudu Mathebe ANC
 Motswaledi Matlala ANC
 Mandisa Matshoba ANC
 Cathrine Matsimbi ANC
 Risimati Mavunda ANC
 Comely Maxegwana ANC
 Fikile Mbalula ANC
 Baleka Mbete ANC
 Sibongile Mchunu ANC
 Buoang Mashile ANC
 Buoang Mashile ANC
 Nomaindia Mfeketo ANC
 Hlengiwe Mkhize ANC
 Bongani Mkongi ANC
 Humphrey Mmemezi ANC
 Martha Mmola ANC
 Samuel Mmusi ANC
 Lungi Mnganga-Gcabashe ANC
 Mnguni Derick ANC
 Pumzile Justice Mnguni ANC
 Nokhaya Mnisi ANC
 Velhelmina Mogotsi ANC
 Rebecca Mokoto ANC
 Maapi Molebatsi ANC
 Edna Molewa ANC
 Masefele Morutoa ANC
 Madipoane Mothapo ANC
 Malusi Motimele ANC
 Mathole Motshekga ANC
 Angie Motshekga ANC
 Aaron Motsoaledi ANC
 Loyiso Mpumlwana ANC
 Mququ Pindiwe Claribell ANC
 Jackson Mthembu ANC
 Mthembu Nokukhanya ANC
 Nathi Mthethwa ANC
 Mthethwa Enock Muzi ANC
 Abram Mudau ANC
 Faith Muthambi ANC
 Elleck Nchabeleng ANC
 Claudia Nonhlanhla Ndaba ANC
 Stella Ndabeni-Abrahams ANC
 Nokuzola Ndongeni ANC
 Andries Nel ANC
 Bonisile Nesi ANC
 Beatrice Ngcobo ANC
 Phumuzile Ngwenya-Mabila ANC
 Mogotle Nkadimeng ANC
 Maite Nkoana-Mashabane ANC
 Gugile Nkwinti ANC
 Girly Nobanda ANC
 Nomathemba Theresia November ANC
 Charles Nqakula ANC
 Louis Ntombela ANC
 Thulas Nxesi ANC
 Raesibe Nyalungu ANC
 Hildah Nyambi ANC
 Blade Nzimande ANC
 Oliphant Gaolatlhe Godfrey ANC
 Mildred Oliphant ANC
 Oosthuizen Gerhardus Cornelius ANC
 Naledi Pandor ANC
 Ebrahim Patel ANC
 Dipuuo Peters ANC
 Joe Phaahla ANC
 Pinky Phosa ANC
 Aubin Pikinini ANC
 Chana Pilane-Majake ANC
 Agnes Qikani ANC
 Bheki Radebe ANC
 Sibusiso Radebe ANC
 Jeff Radebe ANC
 Michael Ralegoma ANC
 Cyril Ramaphosa ANC
 Leonard Ramatlakane ANC
 Ngoako Ramatlhodi ANC
 Deborah Dineo Raphuti ANC
 Deborah Raphuti ANC
 Maureen Scheepers ANC
 Olifile Sefako ANC
 Rosina Semenya ANC
 Doreen Senokoanyane ANC
 Connie September ANC
 Susan Shabangu ANC
 Sheila Shope-Sithole ANC
 Mtikeni Sibande ANC
 Lindiwe Sisulu ANC
 Elvis Siwela ANC
 James Skosana ANC
 Mcebisi Skwatsha ANC
 Vincent Smith ANC
 Maggie Sotyu ANC
 Litho Suka ANC
 Enver Surty ANC
 Elizabeth Thabethe ANC
 Setlamorago Thobejane ANC
 Barbara Thomson ANC
 Sello Tleane ANC
 Thandi Tobias ANC
 Xoliswa Tom ANC
 Tshoganetso Tongwane ANC
 Grace Tseke ANC
 Rembuluwani Tseli ANC
 Lechesa Tsenoli ANC
 Pamela Tshwete ANC
 Sibongile Tsoleli ANC
 Dikeledi Tsotetsi ANC
 Des van Rooyen ANC
 Sharome van Schalkwyk ANC
 Adrian Williams ANC
 Tokozile Xasa ANC
 Sheilla Xego ANC
 Lumka Yengeni ANC
 Senzeni Zokwana ANC
 Lindiwe Zulu ANC
 Mosebenzi Zwane ANC

African People's Convention 
 Themba Godi APC

Agang 
 Andries Plouamma AGANG
 Michael Tshishonga AGANG

Congress of the People 
 Deidre Carter COPE
 Mosiuoa Lekota COPE
 William Mothipa Madisha COPE

Democratic Alliance 
 Patrick Atkinson DA
 Michael Bagraim DA
 Tarnia Baker DA
 Nosimo Balindlela DA
 Leonard Basson DA
 Darren Bergman DA
 Nqaba Bhanga DA
 Sonja Boshoff DA
 Belinda Bozzoli DA
 Tim Brauteseth DA
 Derrick America DA
 Glynnis Breytenbach DA
 Michael Cardo DA
 Yusuf Cassim DA
 Roger Chance DA
 Mergan Chetty DA
 Gavin Davis DA
 Manuel de Freitas DA
 Karen de Kock DA
 Anchen Dreyer DA
 Johanna Edwards DA
 Shahid Esau DA
 Malcolm Figg DA
 Makashule Gana DA
 Tandeka Gqada DA
 Herman Groenewald DA
 Allen Grootboom DA
 Archibold Figlan DA
 Thomas Hadebe DA
 Geordin Hill-Lewis DA
 Haniff Hoosen DA
 Werner Horn DA
 Chris Hunsinger DA
 Wilmot James DA
 Lungiswa James DA
 Zelda Jongbloed DA
 Jacques Julius DA
 Sandy Kalyan DA
 Dianne Kohler Barnard DA
 Patricia Kopane DA
 Christiaan Krüger DA
 Gregory Krumbock DA
 Cathlene Labuschagne DA
 Alf Lees DA
 Jaco Londt DA
 James Lorimer DA
 Annelie Lotriet DA
 Annette Lovemore DA
 Gordon Mackay DA
 MacKenzie Cameron DA
 Dean Macpherson DA
 Mmusi Maimane DA
 Richard Majola DA
 Solly Malatsi DA
 Erik Marais DA
 Kobus Marais DA
 Choloane David Matsepe DA
 David Maynier DA
 Natasha Mazzone DA
 Zakhele Mbhele DA
 Alan Mcloughlin DA
 Tsepo Mhlongo DA
 Michalakis George DA
 Kevin Mileham DA
 Stevens Mokgalapa DA
 Sej Motau DA
 Ian Ollis DA
 Winston Rabotapi DA
 Marius Redelinghuys DA
 Ken Robertson DA
 Denise Robinson DA
 David Christie Ross DA
 Hendrik Schmidt DA
 James Selfe DA
 Marian Shinn DA
 Terri Stander DA
 John Steenhuisen DA
 Annette Steyn DA
 Dirk Stubbe DA
 Nomsa Marchesi DA
 Juanita Terblanche DA
 Brandon Topham DA
 Pieter van Dalen DA
 Phumzile van Damme DA
 Désirée van der Walt DA
 Andricus van der Westhuizen DA
 Veronica van Dyk DA
 Heinrich Volmin DA
 James Vos DA
 Thomas Walters (South African politician) DA
 Mike Waters DA
 Andrew Whitfield (politician) DA
 Lindy Wilson DA

Economic Freedom Fighters 
 Hlayiseka Chewane EFF
 Marshall Dlamini EFF
 Godrich Gardee EFF
 Vuyokazi Ketabahle EFF
 Makoti Khawula EFF
 Nicholous Khoza EFF
 Natasha Ntlangwini EFF
 Reneiloe Mashabela EFF
 Mbuyiselo April Matebus EFF
 Leigh-Ann Mathys EFF
 Sam Matiase EFF
 Abinaar Matlhoko EFF
 Asanda Matshobeni EFF
 Hlengiwe Mkhaliphi EFF
 Moses Mbatha EFF
 Veronica Mente EFF
 Phillip Mhlongo EFF
 Mmbatho Mokause EFF
 Fana Mokoena EFF
 Tebogo Mokwele EFF
 Pebane Moteko EFF
 Thilivhali Mulaudzi EFF
 Mbuyiseni Ndlozi EFF
 Pumza Ntobongwana EFF
 Nazier Paulsen EFF
 Thembinkosi Rawula EFF
 Floyd Shivambu EFF
 Primrose Sonti EFF

Freedom Front Plus 
 Anton Alberts FF+
 Pieter Groenewald FF+
 Pieter Mulder FF+
 Corné Mulder FF+

 Mkhuleko Hlengwa IFP
 Khawula Mntomuhle IFP
 Albert Mncwango IFP
 Christian Msimang IFP
 Sibongile Judith Nkomo IFP
 Narend Singh IFP
 Khethamabala Sithole IFP
 Liezl van der Merwe IFP

National Freedom Party 
 Nhlanhlakayise Khubisa NFP
 Sicelo Mabika NFP
 Sibusiso Mncwabe NFP
 Zanele kaMagwaza-Msibi NFP
 Munzoor Shaik Emam NFP
 Maliyakhe Shelembe NFP

Pan Africanist Congress of Azania 
 Bennett Joko PAC

United Democratic Movement 
 Mncedisi Filtane UDM
 Bantu Holomisa UDM
 Nqabayomzi Kwankwa UDM
 Cynthia Majeke UDM

References 

Parliament of South Africa